The Petrace (Fiume Petrace) is a river in the Calabria region of Italy. It flows into the Tyrrhenian Sea at Gioia Tauro. It was known as the Metaurus in Latin. It is formed at the confluence of the rivers Marro and Duverso.

References

Rivers of Italy
Rivers of the Province of Reggio Calabria